"The Pride" is a song by American heavy metal band Five Finger Death Punch. It is the third track from their third album American Capitalist, the fifth single from the album, and is the fourteenth single overall from the band.

Background
The people, brands and organisations listed in the song all relate to capitalism or the culture of the United States. In an interview, guitarist Zoltan Bathory clarified the meaning of the song.  "You can be a zebra or join the lion pride. You have to rebel against your circumstances, laziness, and mediocrity—not the system."

Music video
The music video was uploaded to the band's Vevo channel on YouTube on October 8, 2012. The video features clips of the band backstage and performing the song live on the American Capitalist Tour.

Track listing

Personnel
 Zoltan Bathory – rhythm guitar
 Jason Hook – lead guitar, backing vocals
 Ivan Moody – lead vocals
 Chris Kael – bass, backing vocals
 Jeremy Spencer – drums

Charts

References

External links
 
  Official music video

Five Finger Death Punch songs
2011 songs
Song recordings produced by Kevin Churko
Songs written by Kevin Churko
Songs written by Zoltan Bathory
Songs written by Ivan Moody (vocalist)
Songs written by Jason Hook
Songs written by Jeremy Spencer (drummer)
Nu metal songs
Rap rock songs
List songs